Samiuela "Sam" Lousi (born 20 July 1991) is a Tongan professional rugby footballer. He currently plays rugby union for the Scarlets after earlier being with the Hurricanes and the New South Wales Waratahs in Super Rugby. He has been capped for the Tonga national team. He previously played rugby league for the New Zealand Warriors. His usual playing position is Prop.

Family and early life
Lousi was born in Auckland, New Zealand. He is the younger brother of Sione Lousi who played international rugby league for Tonga.

A Bay Roskill Vikings and Richmond Rovers junior, Lousi was educated at St Paul's College in Auckland. He played for the New Zealand Warriors Toyota Cup squad, being part of their grand final winning squads in 2010 and 2011. He finished his Toyota Cup career with 43 games and 11 tries.

Lousi represented the Junior Kiwis rugby league team in 2010 and 2011.

Career

Rugby league
Lousi signed with Warriors until the end of the 2013 season and was the tallest and second heaviest player in the squad. He spent the 2012 season playing for the Auckland Vulcans in the NSW Cup before making his National Rugby League debut in round 20 as a last minute replacement for Steve Rapira, who suffered an injury in pre-match warm ups. Lousi had played a game for the Vulcans earlier in the day.

Rugby union
Lousi signed with the NSW Waratahs for the 2015 season but, after gaining four caps, he suffered a shoulder injury which ended his Super Rugby campaign. He joined the New South Wales Country Eagles team in the National Rugby Championship for the 2015 season.  In 2016, he joined Sydney club Southern Districts. In 2019, he agreed to join Scarlets. In that same year he was selected to play for Tonga in the Rugby World Cup in Japan.

References

External links
 It's Rugby stats
NRL profile

1991 births
Living people
Auckland rugby league team players
Bay Roskill Vikings players
New Zealand rugby league players
New Zealand sportspeople of Tongan descent
New Zealand Warriors players
Junior Kiwis players
Richmond Bulldogs players
People educated at St Paul's College, Auckland
New South Wales Waratahs players
New South Wales Country Eagles players
New Zealand rugby union players
New Zealand expatriate rugby union players
New Zealand expatriate sportspeople in Australia
Expatriate rugby union players in Australia
Hurricanes (rugby union) players
Rugby league players from Auckland
Rugby league props
Rugby league second-rows
Rugby union locks
Rugby union players from Auckland
Scarlets players
Tonga international rugby union players
Wellington rugby union players